José Manuel Losada (Zamora, 1962) is a university professor and literary theorist with a specialization in the fields of myth criticism and comparative literature. Within these fields he has published several books in Spanish, French and English.

Academic career 
José Manuel Losada holds a PhD from the University of the Sorbonne (1990) and a habilitation as Research Director (HDR) from the University of Nancy II. He has been Assistant Professor at the University of Navarre, Visiting Scholar at Harvard University, Visiting Professor at the University of Montreal and Oxford University (St John's College), and Senior Fellow at the University of Durham (University College). He has also been Associate Professor at the University of Navarre and has given post-doctoral seminars at the universities of Jerusalem, Montpellier, Münster, Munich (LMU), Valencia and Carthague (Tunisia) He is now a Full Professor at Complutense University of Madrid, where he teaches courses on French literature, comparative literature, and literature and religion.

J.M. Losada is the founder and editor of Amaltea, Journal of Myth Criticism  (2008 –), a prestigious academic journal with a focus on analyzing the reception of ancient, medieval and modern myths in contemporary arts and literature. He is also founder and president of Asteria, International Association for Myth Criticism,
a not-for-profit cultural association with an aim to promote research on myth in contemporary arts and literature. Furthermore, he is the founder and director of Acis, a myth criticism research group which brings together numerous academics and doctoral researchers with an interest in analyzing the contemporary relevance of myth from an interdisciplinary perspective. He is also the principal investigator in several R&D projects related to myth criticism. With the support of the members of these groups, Losada has coordinated many international conferences, outreach activities ("Mythological Walks" programmed in the Madrid Science Week), and international art competitions on the subject of myth.

His academic production includes some twenty books and over two hundred articles published in academic books and journals.

Cultural Myth Criticism 
Losada defines myth as "a functional, symbolic and thematic narrative of one or several extraordinary events with a transcendent, sacred and supernatural referent; that lacks, in principle, historical testimony; and that refers to an individual or collective, but always absolute, cosmogony or eschatology."

This syncretic, expansive concept of myth allows the critic to embark on innovative analysis and synthesis of mythical narratives and their diverse processes.

Myth criticism –a term coined by Gilbert Durand– is the study of myth; Losada's main contribution to literary theory is related to the updating of these studies into what he calls "Cultural Myth Criticism".

Cultural Myth Criticism places particular emphasis on the sacred, supernatural transcendence of myth. Losada states in numerous texts the differences between this transcendence and the transcendence that operates in other imaginary correlates (fantasy, science-fiction and esotericism). Losada also fully escapes from partial and distorting approaches to myth (manifestation of psychoanalytic complexes or social deformations: Freud, Barthes, etc.). There is myth only when two characters of a work of fiction, one from the sacred supernatural world, and the other from the natural world, establish contact. This interpretation (“the myth as an object”, the “value” in culture and textual interpretation), allows him to avoid reductive approaches to myth. Indeed, Losada considers that the indiscriminate application of a series of configuring factors of contemporary Western society (social and technical globalization, the “doxa” of democratic and consumerist relativism and the logic of vital and reflexive immanence) can mislead the critics who approach myth. Conscious and fond of today’s world, Losada proposes taking into account these factors as a benchmark and contrast for a truly academic study of myth. Without losing sight of previous approaches, this new myth criticism develops an epistemology that enables to comprehend and explain an imaginary and global reality, aimed at a greater understanding of the true message of myths for today’s culture. This discipline is the result of the main interpretation premises assumed by J.M. Losada:

 Myth criticism requires a previous assumption of a definition of myth which can be applied to every specific instance (otherwise, the literary critic would be “playing with a marked deck”). Any myth is structured on a grid of mythemes (any mytheme has a transcendent valence).
 Myth criticism requires the use of a correct terminology which distinguishes: 
 Myth from other related tools: symbol, theme, archetype, prototype, hero, etc.
 Myth from other correlates of the imaginary: esotericism, fantasy, science fiction.
 Myth from pseudo-myth, i.e., mythicized historic characters or social and political sublimations.

Cultural myth criticism has proved to be particularly useful in the analysis of contemporary myths. Many researchers have followed these methodological principles to approach an innovative analysis and synthesis of mythical narratives.

Main Works

Books 
 1993: Tirso, Molière, Pouchkine, Lenau. Analyses et synthèses sur un mythe littéraire. Edited with Pierre Brunel, Paris, Klincksieck. .
 1997: Bibliography of the Myth of Don Juan in Literary History, José Manuel Losada ed. Lewiston, New York: Edwin Mellen Press. .
 1999: Bibliographie critique de la littérature espagnole en France au XVIIe siècle. Présence et influence, Geneva (Switzerland): Droz. .
 2010: Métamorphoses du roman français. Avatars d'un genre dévorateur, José Manuel Losada ed. Lovaina (Belgium): Peeters. .
 2010: Mito y mundo contemporáneo. La recepción de los mitos antiguos, medievales y modernos en la literatura contemporánea. Bari (Italy): Levante Editori. .
 2012: Myth and Subversion in the Contemporary Novel. Newcastle upon Tyne: Cambridge Scholars Publishing. Edited with Marta Guirao. .
 2013: Mito e interdisciplinariedad. Los mitos antiguos, medievales y modernos en la literatura y las artes contemporáneas. Bari (Italy): Levante Editori. Edited with Antonella Lipscomb. .
 2014: Abordajes. Mitos y reflexiones sobre el mar. José Manuel Losada ed., Madrid: Instituto Español de Oceanografía. .
 2014: Victor Hugo et l’Espagne. L’imaginaire hispanique dans l’œuvre poétique. In collaboration with André Labertit, Paris, Honoré Champion. .
 2015: Myths in Crisis: The Crisis of Myth. Newcastle upon Tyne: Cambridge Scholars Publishing. Edited with Antonella Lipscomb. .
 2015: Nuevas formas del mito, José Manuel Losada ed. Berlin: Logos Verlag. .
 2016: Mitos de hoy. Ensayos de mitocrítica cultural, José Manuel Losada ed., Berlin, Logos Verlag. .
 2017: Myth and Emotions, Newcastle upon Tyne: Cambridge Scholars Publishing. Edited with Antonella Lipscomb. .
 2019: Myth and Audiovisual Creation, Berlín: Logos Verlag. Edited with Antonella Lipscomb. .
 2021: Mito y ciencia ficción, Madrid: Sial Pigmalión. Edited with Antonella Lipscomb. .
 2022: El Jardín de las Hespérides: del mito a la belleza, Madrid: Ediciones Complutense. Curator and Editor. .
 2022: Mitocrítica cultural. Una definición del mito, Madrid: Akal. ISBN 9788446052678.

Articles 
 1989. “Calderón de la Barca: El laurel de Apolo”. Revista de Literatura (Madrid), 51: 485–494. .
 2004: "The Myth of the Fallen Angel. Its Theosophy in Scandinavian, English, and French Literature". Nonfictional Romantic Prose. Expanding Borders, Steven P. Sondrup & Virgil Nemoianu eds. Amsterdam / Philadelphia (PA): John Benjamins: 433–457. DOI: 10.1075/chlel.xviii.34los. .
 2008: “Victor Hugo et le mythe de Don Juan”, Don Juans insolites, Pierre Brunel ed. París : Presses de l’Université Paris-Sorbonne: 79–86. .
 2009: “La nature mythique du Graal dans Le Conte du Graal de Chrétien de Troyes”. Cahiers de Civilisation Médiévale (Poitiers), 52,1 (2009): 3–20. .
 2014: "Myth and Extraordinary Event". International Journal of Language and Literature. New York: pp. 31 – 55. Link
 2015: “Myth and Origins: Men Want to Know”, Journal of Literature and Art Studies. New York, vol. 5, nº 10, pp. 930–945.  (print)  (online).
 2016: “El mundo de la fantasía y el mundo del mito. Los cuentos de hadas”, Çédille, “Monografías”, 6: 69-100. . Link
 2017: “El «mito» de Don Quijote (2ª parte): ¿con o sin comillas? En busca de criterios pertinentes del mito”, Cervantès, quatre siècles après: nouveaux objets, nouvelles approches, Emmanuel Marigno et al. eds., Binges (France): Éditions Orbis Tertius: 11–32. .
 2018: “Le personnage mythique”, Degrés. Revue de synthèse à orientation sémiologique (Brussels), 45: c1-c18. .
 2019: “Preface: The Myth of the Eternal Return”, Journal of Comparative Literature and Aesthetics, 40.2: 7-10. . Link
 2020: “Mito y antropogonía en la literatura hispanoamericana: Hombres de maíz, de Miguel Ángel Asturias”, Rassegna iberistica (Venezia), 43, 113, Giugno (2020), 41-56. e-ISSN: 2037-6588. . Link
 2020: “Cultural Myth Criticism and Today’s Challenges to Myth”, Explaining, Interpreting, and Theorizing Religion and Myth: Contributions in Honor of Robert A. Segal, Nickolas B. Roubekas and Thomas Ryba (eds.), Leiden, Koninklijke Brill NV, 2020, pp. 355–370. . Link

References 

Spanish literary critics
Living people
1962 births
Mythographers
Comparative mythologists